Sugar Museum may refer to several institutions, including:

 Sugar Museum (Berlin) in Berlin, Germany 
 Alexander & Baldwin Sugar Museum in Puʻunene, Hawaii
 Museum of Brown Sugar, a former museum in Recife, Brazil
 Sugar Museum in Nakskov, Denmark
 Redpath Sugar Museum at Redpath Sugar Refinery in Toronto, Canada
 Taiwan Sugar Museum in Kaohsiung
 Sugar Museum in Tienen, Belgium
 Australian Sugar Industry Museum in Mourilyan, Queensland
 Barley Sugar Museum in Moret-sur-Loing, France